Benjamin Donnelly (born August 22, 1996) is a Canadian speed skater. Donnelly was born in Ajax, but his hometown is the neighbouring city of Oshawa.

Career

Junior
During the 2016 World Junior Speed Skating Championships held in Changchun, China, Donnelly won 5 medals (three gold). Donnelly won two individual gold medals, a silver in the team pursuit and 1500m and the overall title.

2018 Winter Olympics
In January 2018, Donnelly was named to Canada's 2018 Olympic team.

References

1996 births
Living people
Canadian male speed skaters
People from Ajax, Ontario
Sportspeople from Ontario
Speed skaters at the 2018 Winter Olympics
Olympic speed skaters of Canada
21st-century Canadian people